Olteni is a commune in Teleorman County, Muntenia, Romania. It is composed of two villages, Olteni and Perii Broșteni.

See also
Juventus Olteni

References

Communes in Teleorman County
Localities in Muntenia